Glaval Bus, a manufacturer of buses, is a division of Forest River. The company is based in Elkhart, Indiana in the United States. Some bus models are also made by Overland Custom Coach in London, Ontario, Canada.

Clients
City of Santa Clarita Transit
MetroX / Metro Transit (Halifax)
Edmonton Transit System
Coach America
Indianapolis International Airport
JetBlue Airways
Gray Line of Seattle
Northern Arizona University in Flagstaff, Arizona, for parking and shuttle services

Buses

The Universal model is based on a Ford E-450 chassis.

References

External links
Glaval Bus website

Bus manufacturers of the United States
Companies based in Elkhart County, Indiana
Berkshire Hathaway